is a city located in Osaka Prefecture, Japan. , the city had an estimated population of 489,077 in 233,124 households and a population density of 7900 persons per km². The city is known as one of the industrial cities of Japan and "the rugby football town".

Geography
Higashiōsaka is located in the eastern part of the Osaka Plain,bordered by the Osaka metropolis to the west. Most of the city area is flat lowlands laced with rivers and has been subject to periodic flooding. The main rivers include the Nagase River, Onji River, Tamagushi River, and Daini Neya River. The eastern part of the city rises to the Ikoma Mountains, forming the border with Nara Prefecture. The city measures approximately 11.2 kilometers from east-to-west by 7.9 kilometers from north-to-south.

Surrounding municipalities
 Osaka Prefecture
 Tsurumi-ku, Osaka 
 Jōtō-ku, Osaka
 Higashinari-ku, Osaka
 Ikuno-ku, Osaka 
 Hirano-ku, Osaka
 Daitō
 Shijōnawate
 Yao
 Nara Prefecture
 Ikoma
 Heguri

Climate
Higashiōsaka has a Humid subtropical climate (Köppen Cfa) characterized by warm summers and cool winters with light to no snowfall.  The average annual temperature in Higashiōsaka is 15.6 °C. The average annual rainfall is 1475 mm with September as the wettest month. The temperatures are highest on average in August, at around 27.7 °C, and lowest in January, at around 4.2 °C.

Demographics
Per Japanese census data, the population of Higashiōsaka increased rapidly from the 1950s through 1970s, and has leveled off since.

History
The location of Higashiōsaka corresponds to the central part of Kawachi Province. In ancient times, this area was an extension of Osaka Bay called Kawachi Bay, which gradually became separated from the sea and became a lake. The lake gradually became land due to the accumulation of sediment by the Yamato River. During the Kofun and Asuka periods, this was the homeland of the Mononobe clan, and was on the main road between the Yamato Basin and the port at Naniwa, with sea connections to the Asian continent. During the Heian period, the area was largely controlled by Hiraoka Shrine. From the Muromachi period, it was the base of the Hatakeyama clan to control Kawachi Province, but due to internal conflicts it can under the control of the Miyoshi clan. Later it was the site of battles during the 1615 Siege of Osaka. In the Edo Period, flood control projects on the Yamato River created a large amount of reclaimed land, which was developed by wealthy Osaka merchants for rice and cotton production.

On April 1, 2005, Higashiōsaka became a Core city with increased local autonomy.

Government
Higashiōsaka has a mayor-council form of government with a directly elected mayor and a unicameral city council of 38 members. Higashiōsaka contributes five members to the Osaka Prefectural Assembly. In terms of national politics, the city is part of Osaka 13th district of the lower house of the Diet of Japan.

Elections 
 2007 Higashiōsaka city assembly election
 2006 Higashiōsaka mayoral election
 2006 Higashiosaka by-election

Economy
Higashiōsaka is one of the most densely populated areas of small and medium-sized enterprises in Japan, and many small factories with high technology occupy a global share. The ratio of factories to the area is the highest in Japan. The number of factories is also the highest except for government-designated cities such as Osaka City and Yokohama City. However, industry has been decreasing in recent years, and there are cases where factory sites have been converted to residential areas for commuters to the Osaka metropolis.

Yamamoto Kogaku, an eyewear manufacturer, known for its brand Swans, is headquartered in the city. The city is also home of RAYS, a high-end wheel manufacturer for both motorsport and street use.

Education

Colleges and universities
Kindai University
Osaka University of Commerce
Osaka Shoin Women's University
Higashiosaka College
Higashiosaka Junior College

High schools
Prefectural senior high schools:
Osaka Prefectural Fuse High School (大阪府立布施高等学校)
Osaka Prefectural Hanazono Senior High School (大阪府立花園高等学校)
Midori Seiho Senior High School (大阪府立みどり清朋高等学校)
Kawachino High School (大阪府立かわち野高等学校)
Osaka Prefectural Hiraoka Shofu High School (大阪府立枚岡樟風高等学校)
Fuse Kita High School (大阪府立布施北高等学校)
Joto Technology High School (大阪府立城東工科高等学校)
Fuse Technology High School (大阪府立布施工科高等学校)

Municipal senior high schools:
東大阪市立日新高等学校

Other senior high schools:
近畿大学附属高等学校 
大阪商業大学高等学校
樟蔭高等学校 
樟蔭東高等学校 
東大阪大学敬愛高等学校

North Korea-aligned Korean international schools:
Osaka Korean High School
Higashi Osaka Korean Elementary School (東大阪朝鮮初級学校)

Transportation

Railway
 JR West – Katamachi Line (Gakkentoshi Line) 
 -  
 JR West – Osaka Higashi Line 
 -  -  -  
 Kintetsu Railway -   Nara Line
  -  -  -  -  -  -  -  -  -  - 
 Kintetsu Railway -   Osaka Line
  -  -  - 
 Kintetsu Railway -   Keihanna Line
  -  -  - 
 Osaka Metro  -  Chūō Line 
 -

Highways
Expressways
 Higashiosaka-kita Interchange - Higashiosaka Parking Area - Higashiosaka-minami Interchange

 Hanshin Expressway Higashi-Osaka Route
Shigi Ikoma Skyline

Sports
In association football, the city of Higashiōsaka is represented by FC Osaka.

Sister cities
 Borough of Mitte, Berlin, Germany (since 1959)
 Glendale, California, United States

Local attractions
Hiraoka Shrine
Higashi Osaka Hanazono Rugby Stadium
Kusaka Shell Mound
Kōnoike Shinden Kaisho ruins

References

External links

 Higashiōsaka City official website 
 International Information Plaza 

 
Cities in Osaka Prefecture